The 2011 1. divisjon (referred to as Adeccoligaen for sponsorship reasons) was a Norwegian second-tier football season. The season began play on 3 April 2011 and ended on 30 October 2011.

The clubs relegated from the 2010 Tippeligaen were Hønefoss (after relegation play-offs), Kongsvinger and Sandefjord. Asker, HamKam, Hødd, and Randaberg were promoted from the 2010 2. divisjon.

Following an extended period of financial distress, Lyn withdrew from the league in 2010. Follo did not finish their licensing application for the 2011 season before the time limit of 15 September 2010, and were thus relegated at the end of the 2010 season even though they finished 12th, outside of the relegation zone. As a result of this the 13th placed team, Sandnes Ulf, avoided relegation. Tromsdalen and Moss were the remaining two teams relegated to the 2011 2. divisjon.

At the end of the season, the two best teams were promoted to the 2012 Tippeligaen, while the four bottom placed teams were relegated to the 2012 2. divisjon. There was not a two-legged promotion play-off this season.

Overview

Managerial changes

League table

Results

Statistics

Top goalscorers

†Remond Mendy scored nine goals in fifteen games for Nybergsund IL-Trysil.

Source: Alt om fotball

See also 
 2011 in Norwegian football
 2011 Tippeligaen
 2011 2. divisjon
 2011 3. divisjon

References

Norwegian First Division seasons
2
Norway
Norway